Kim Kuk-young ( or  ; born 19 April 1991) is a South Korean track and field sprinter who competes in the 100 metres. He set a national record in the men's 100-meter sprint at the 2015 Summer Universiade. His personal best, & the current Korean men's 100m national record, is 10.07 set in Jeongseon on 27 June 2017.

References

External links

South Korean male sprinters
Athletes (track and field) at the 2010 Asian Games
Athletes (track and field) at the 2014 Asian Games
Athletes (track and field) at the 2018 Asian Games
World Athletics Championships athletes for South Korea
People from Anyang, Gyeonggi
1991 births
Living people
Athletes (track and field) at the 2016 Summer Olympics
Olympic athletes of South Korea
Asian Games competitors for South Korea
Competitors at the 2015 Summer Universiade
Sportspeople from Gyeonggi Province
21st-century South Korean people